El Perro del Mar is the second album by Swedish musician Sarah Assbring, a.k.a. El Perro del Mar. It was first released in Sweden on 10 April 2006 by Hybris Records, in Europe by Memphis Industries, in Australasia on 6 November 2006 by Rogue Records, and in the United States on 7 November 2006 by The Control Group. The album is a revised version of her 2005 compilation Look! It's El Perro del Mar!.

The album was preceded by a single release for "God Knows (You Gotta Give to Get)" in November 2005; its accompanying animated music video was directed by Åsa Arnehed. A music video for "Party", directed by Emily de Groot, followed in 2006.

On 19 May 2015, The Control Group reissued the album for its tenth anniversary. The reissue includes a selection of bonus tracks, demos and radio sessions, and was released on green-coloured double vinyl.

Track listing

References

2006 albums
El Perro del Mar albums